The White Chamber, stylized as the white chamber, is a science fiction adventure game created by Studio Trophis using the Wintermute Engine. Originally designed as a university project, it was expanded to a full game and released for Microsoft Windows as free download in 2005.

Gameplay
The player controls a girl who awakens in a coffin in a darkened room. She has no memory of how she got there, and opens the windows to reveal that she is in fact in space. The player must solve the puzzles and move from room to room, piecing together what happened to the crew of the station. Along the way, she discovers logs from a technician named Arthur Anderson documenting the mystery of the main laboratory, the titular "white chamber".

Release history
The first release of the game was released for free in 2005, and featured four endings depending on the player's choices during the game. It originally had no voice acting, but several animated sections, including an opening and ending. The inclusion of anime sequences meant the game was over 300 MB to download.

The size was one of the contributing factors to the fact that it was originally available exclusively through bittorrent. In an article for PCZone Richard Perrin stated that using bittorrent allowed them to reduce their bandwidth costs greatly. The game is no longer available for direct download on the Studio Trophis site, due to unexpected increases in traffic. There is however, a download link on the site page.

The game has been updated multiple times and is now at version 1.7. It features eight endings and the text in nine languages, English, Czech, French, German, Greek, Italian, Polish, Portuguese and Russian and voice acting in either English or German.

The game's source code and assets have been released under the CC BY-NC-SA Creative Commons license. That means anyone is free to share and modify the game as long as Studio Trophis is credited, it is not for commercial gain, and that the result is made available under a similar license ("Freeware"). The game's engine ("Wintermute") source code was later released under the MIT license in 2013 on Bitbucket.

Around 2014 a remastered version was announced for commercial re-release, by Richard Perrin's successor company.

Reception

The game has received very positive critical reactions. The New York Times described it as "Grisly and intriguing, with logical puzzles and surprising plot twists, Chamber is a first-rate garage game." The Inventory magazine called it "A genuinely suspenseful horror game in a marvelously drawn anime style. All in all this game is a marvelous first outing by Studio Trophis." and gave 80/100 points. Indie Games Plus included it in their list of top adventure games of 2006.

As of May 2006 the game has been downloaded over 100,000 times and has featured on many magazines across the world (including the UK's best-selling SFX magazine and The New York Times) and appeared often on cover discs.

References

External links

The White Chamber project page

2005 video games
Adventure games
Adventure games set in space
Psychological horror games
Science fiction video games
Video games developed in the United Kingdom
Windows games
Windows-only games
Freeware games
Indie video games
Point-and-click adventure games
Video games featuring female protagonists
Video games with alternate endings
Video games with available source code
Creative Commons-licensed video games
Single-player video games